Mahonry Montes Castillo (born 18 November 1989) is a Mexican professional boxer of Russian descent.

Professional career
On July 25, 2008 Montes beat veteran Trinidad Mendoza to win the WBC FECARBOX super featherweight title.

References

External links

Boxers from Sinaloa
Mexican people of Russian descent
Sportspeople from Los Mochis
Super-featherweight boxers
1989 births
Living people
Mexican male boxers